is a railway station in the town of Kōta, Aichi Prefecture, Japan, operated by Central Japan Railway Company (JR Tōkai).

Lines
Sangane Station is served by the Tōkaidō Main Line, and is located 315.5 kilometers from the starting point of the line at Tokyo Station.

Station layout
The station has two opposed side platforms connected by an elevated station building located perpendicular to the tracks and platforms. The station building has automated ticket machines, TOICA automated turnstiles and is unattended.

Platforms

Adjacent stations

|-
!colspan=5|Central Japan Railway Company

Station history
Sangane Station was opened on March 20, 1967, as a station on the Japan National Railway (JNR), after petitions by local residents over a period of more than seventeen years. Automated turnstiles using the TOICA IC Card system came into operation from November 25, 2006.

Station numbering was introduced to the section of the Tōkaidō Line operated JR Central in March 2018; Sangane Station was assigned station number CA49

Passenger statistics
In fiscal 2017, the station was used by an average of 965 passengers daily (boarding passengers only).

Surrounding area
 Fukōzu Elementary School

See also
 List of Railway Stations in Japan

References

Yoshikawa, Fumio. Tokaido-sen 130-nen no ayumi. Grand-Prix Publishing (2002) .

External links

Railway stations in Japan opened in 1967
Railway stations in Aichi Prefecture
Tōkaidō Main Line
Stations of Central Japan Railway Company
Kōta, Aichi